Balaam and the Ass is a 1626 painting by the Dutch artist Rembrandt, dating from his time in Leiden and now in the Musée Cognacq-Jay in Paris.

The painting portrays the biblical account of the talking ass debating with diviner Balaam.

The scene is based on Rembrandt's teacher Pieter Lastman's composition of the same subject from 1622, now in the Israel Museum Collection, Jerusalem. The figure of Balaam and his ass are direct borrowings from Lastman.

References

Balaam's Donkey (Numbers 22:21-34)

Bibliography
Steven M. Nadler: Rembrandt's Jews, University of Chicago Press, 2003 
Jane Turner (ed.): From Rembrandt to Vermeer - 17th-Century Dutch Artists (Grove Dictionary of Art), 2000., New York, p. 268
http://www.museecognacqjay.paris.fr/en/la-collection/ass-prophet-balaam

1626 paintings
Paintings by Rembrandt
Donkeys in art
Angels in art
Paintings of the Musée Cognacq-Jay
Paintings depicting Hebrew Bible people
Book of Numbers